Dewsbury is a constituency created in 1868. This seat is represented in the House of Commons of the United Kingdom Parliament since 2019 by Mark Eastwood of the Conservative Party.

History 
Summary of results
Dewsbury's seat dates back to 1868 and the electorate has usually given the winning MP marginal majorities which means it is a marginal seat.  Labour MPs served the seat from 1935 until 1983 and again from 1987. In 2010 it was gained by Simon Reevell, a Conservative.

Other parties results
One of the five other parties' candidates standing in 2015 kept their deposit, by winning more than 5% of the vote in 2015, UKIP's Thackray, who emulated the national swing of +9.5% by an entry candidature, polling 12.4% of the vote.

Turnout
Turnout since 1918 has ranged between 87.9% of the vote in 1950, to 58.8% in 2001.

Boundaries 

1868–1885: The townships of Dewsbury, Batley, and Soothill.

1918–1950: The County Borough of Dewsbury.

1950–1955: The County Borough of Dewsbury, the Municipal Borough of Ossett, and the Urban Districts of Heckmondwike and Mirfield.

1955–1983: The County Borough of Dewsbury, the Municipal Borough of Ossett, and the Urban District of Mirfield.

1983–1997: The Borough of Kirklees wards of Denby Dale, Dewsbury East, Dewsbury West, Kirkburton, Mirfield, and Thornhill.

1997–2010: The Borough of Kirklees wards of Dewsbury East, Dewsbury West, Heckmondwike, Mirfield, and Thornhill.

2010–present: The Borough of Kirklees wards of Denby Dale, Dewsbury East, Dewsbury South, Dewsbury West, Kirkburton, and Mirfield.

The constituency covers the towns of Dewsbury and Mirfield, and the surrounding areas.

In the 2010 redistribution, the constituency lost the Labour-leaning ward of Heckmondwike, but gained the Conservative-leaning wards of Denby Dale and Kirkburton.

Constituency profile 
The seat has a substantial Muslim population in the town of Dewsbury (particularly the Savile Town district), combined a few suburban and rural affluent parts such as Denby Dale, Mirfield, and Kirkburton.  The town of Dewsbury itself is strongly Labour, and the remaining wards mostly Conservative. Overall the seat has close to national average income and several developments have desirable views as the upland town cuts into the Pennines. Relatively few people rely upon social housing, however the Dewsbury East ward contains a high proportion of social housing in the Chickenley estate, while Dewsbury South contains the Thornhill area, where the local school was the subject of the acclaimed Educating Yorkshire series. In the light of increasing concern over Muslim extremism, the Labour Party candidate Shahid Malik enjoyed a fairly large public media profile after his victory in 2005, with various TV appearances and interviews, strongly denouncing believers in and adherents of such views; however, this has also been a strong area for the British National Party, who obtained their highest vote in Britain (13.1%) in the 2005 general election, much of it taken at the Labour Party's expense. They have also had a substantial vote at local level, when in 2006 for the first time in the UK the BNP polled more votes than any other party standing. However, at the 2010 general election, the BNP's popularity in Dewsbury fell (despite a substantial nationwide rise in support for the party compared to five years previously) and they gained a mere 6% of the vote.

Members of Parliament

Election results

Elections in the 2010s

Elections in the 2000s

Elections in the 1990s

 Swing in 1997 is based on notional figures as the seat had been redrawn prior to the election.

Elections in the 1980s

Elections in the 1970s

Elections in the 1960s

Elections in the 1950s

Elections in the 1940s

General Election 1939–40:

Another General Election was due to take place before the end of 1940. The political parties had been making preparations for an election to take place from 1939 and by the end of this year, the following candidates had been selected: 
Labour: Benjamin Riley 
Liberal: Ronald Walker 
Liberal National:Richard Soper

Elections in the 1930s

Elections in the 1920s

Elections in the 1910s

Elections in the 1900s

Elections in the 1890s

Elections in the 1880s

 Caused by Simon's resignation.

Elections in the 1870s

Elections in the 1860s

See also 
 List of parliamentary constituencies in West Yorkshire

Notes

References
Specific

General
Craig, F. W. S. (1983). British parliamentary election results 1918–1949 (3 ed.). Chichester: Parliamentary Research Services. .

Sources
 

Parliamentary constituencies in Yorkshire and the Humber
Constituencies of the Parliament of the United Kingdom established in 1868
Politics of Kirklees
Dewsbury